Front Porch Republic is a localist and communitarian American blog where various contributors—known as 'porchers'—emphasize the importance of concepts such as community, place, decentralism, and conservation. Front Porch Republic publishes books under the name Front Porch Republic Books. It also sponsors an annual conference and, beginning in 2019, publishes a print journal: Local Culture.

Ideology
Porchers have myriad opinions, but generally agree that centralization, atomization, and disregard for limits represent obstacles to human flourishing.

Damon Linker describes Front Porch Republic in The Week:
Unlike the leaders of the mainstream conservative movement, Patrick Deneen, Mark T. Mitchell, Russell Arben Fox, Jeremy Beer, and the other "Porchers" have little interest in engaging with inside-the-Beltway power politics. Instead, they prefer to act as gadflies, denouncing the imperial ethos and influence-peddling that dominates Washington, as well as the boundless greed that drives would-be Masters of the Universe from around the country to seek their fortunes on Wall Street and in Hollywood and Silicon Valley.

Current staff

References

External links
Front Porch Republic Official Website

American blogs